Hearts On Fire Company, LLC, branded as Hearts On Fire, is a privately held diamond jewelry design and manufacturing company founded in 1996 by Glenn and Susan Rothman.  The privately held company is based in Boston, Massachusetts, United States, with products sold online and in 550 retail stores in 34 countries around the world, including 14 Hearts On Fire stores.

Company history
Glenn Rothman and wife Susan started a diamond wholesale business in 1978. On a trip to Belgium in 1996, Rothman saw a round brilliant cut diamond displaying a hearts and arrows pattern due to its geometrically optimized cut.  Rothman dubbed the diamond "Hearts On Fire" and began selling under the registered trademark "The World's Most Perfectly Cut Diamond."

In 1998 the company established a presence in Taiwan, Singapore, Hong Kong, and the Caribbean. The next year, the company launched its first collection of diamond jewelry, creating diamond rings and earrings using its own diamonds.

In 2002, Hearts On Fire patented the "Dream" cut diamond, a version of the modified square cut.

In 2014, Hearts On Fire was sold to one of the world's largest retailers of jewelry, Chow Tai Fook Jewellery Group, for 150 million dollars.

Partnerships
In 2002, Hearts On Fire supplied diamonds to fashion designer Anne Bowen to create a diamond dress for the 74th Academy Awards ceremony. The gown was worn on the red carpet by E! Entertainment Television anchor Jules Asner and was estimated to cost over $5M.

In 2006, the company supplied diamonds to lingerie company Victoria's Secret to create one of the world's most expensive bras, the Victoria's Secret Hearts On Fire Diamond Fantasy Bra, valued at $6.5 million.

The next year, the company supplied diamonds to Godiva Chocolatier for a Valentine's Day prize of over $1M in diamond jewelry, the largest prize in the history of either company.

In 2008, upon the launch of its Architectural Collection, a jewelry line inspired by architectural structures from all over the world, the company created a diamond chandelier to celebrate the 60th anniversary of the Emmy Awards. The chandelier was made using more than 3,300 diamonds weighing over 1,000 carats and was valued at $10M. The chandelier was featured in the award show's green room in a partnership with Architectural Digest.

References

External links
Hearts On Fire Website
Hearts on Fire design

Companies based in Boston
American companies established in 1996
Manufacturing companies established in 1996
Retail companies established in 1996
Jewelry retailers of the United States
Privately held companies based in Massachusetts